Paweł Niedźwiecki (born 12 May 1974) is a Polish former road racing cyclist.

Palmarès

External links 

1974 births
Living people
Polish male cyclists
Place of birth missing (living people)